"Love Is Like an Itching in My Heart" is a 1966 song recorded by the Supremes for the Motown label.

Written and produced by Motown's main production team of Holland–Dozier–Holland, the song was recorded in June 1965 and not released until April 1966. It was one of the few singles written by the team for the Supremes that didn't reach number one on the Billboard Hot 100 pop singles chart in the United States. Nevertheless, the song was a Top 10 hit, peaking at number nine for one week in May 1966. Billboard named the song #90 on their list of 100 Greatest Girl Group Songs of All Time.

Overview 
One of the group's most powerful singles, this uptempo and brassy dance single was somewhat of a departure from the group's much lighter, pop-oriented sound, with a production set for an uptempo soul sound similar to that of material by fellow Motown groups Martha and the Vandellas and the Four Tops. The lyrics tell of how the narrator has been "bitten by the love bug" and no matter what she does, she can't "scratch it" (the itch created by the bite of the love bug). Lead singer Diana Ross' bandmates Florence Ballard and Mary Wilson accompany Ross, as she sings about her lover's grasp on her heart. The girl group performed the hit live on CBS variety program The Ed Sullivan Show on Sunday, May 1, 1966.

Reception
Billboard said of the song "more exciting sounds from the girls in this slow rhythm rocker with solid back beat."  Cash Box described the song as a "throbbing, rhythmic, pop-blues romancer all about a real lucky gal who has finally found the guy that she’s always dreamed about."

Personnel 
Lead vocals by Diana Ross
Background vocals by Florence Ballard and Mary Wilson
Instrumentation by the Funk Brothers
Baritone saxophone by Andrew "Mike" Terry

Charts

References

External links
YouTube Video-"Love Is Like An Itching In My Heart" (Extended Version) - by The Supremes
 

1966 singles
1966 songs
The Supremes songs
Songs written by Holland–Dozier–Holland
Song recordings produced by Brian Holland
Song recordings produced by Lamont Dozier